Cranichis candida is a species of orchid in the subfamily Orchidoideae.

It was described by Célestin Alfred Cogniaux.

References

Plants described in 1895
Cranichidinae